The 303rd Infantry Division, also dubbed Infantry Division "Döberitz", was an infantry division of the German Heer during World War II.

History 
The Infantry Division Döberitz was formed in Military Training Area Döberitz on 31 January 1945. Initially, the division did not carry an ordinal number, but was eventually assigned the number 303. The divisional staff was recruited from the staff of the former 611th Special Purpose (z.b.V.) Division. The division's initial commander was Rudolf Hübner.

Upon formation, the Infantry Division Döberitz consisted of the following parts by early February:

 Grenadier Regiment 300
 Grenadier Regiment 301
 Grenadier Regiment 303
 Division Fusilier Battalion 303
 Artillery Regiment 303
 Division Units 303, Reconnaissance Detachment 1303

The three Grenadier Regiments consisted of two battalions each, whereas the Artillery Regiment consisted of four batteries.

In March 1945, the division was assigned to the CI Army Corps under 9th Army, part of Army Group Vistula. By April, the division was transferred to the XI SS Panzer Corps, also part of the 9th Army. Beginning on 9 March 1945, the division was commanded by a colonel (Oberst) rank officer named Hans-Wolfgang Scheunemann.

In April 1945, at the rear end of the Battle of the Seelow Heights, the division was trapped in the cauldron of the Battle of Halbe and subsequently forced to surrender.

References 

Infantry divisions of Germany during World War II
Military units and formations established in 1945
Military units and formations disestablished in 1945